Puma Sulu (Aymara puma cougar, puma, sulu shell, husk, "puma shell",  Hispanicized spelling Pumasolo) is a  mountain in the Andes of southern  Peru. It is situated in the Moquegua Region, Mariscal Nieto Province, Calacoa District.

References

Mountains of Moquegua Region
Mountains of Peru